Statistics of Emperor's Cup in the 1972 season.

Overview
It was contested by 24 teams. Starting this season, the Japan Soccer League First Division clubs entered automatically while those in the Second Division participated in regional qualifying tournaments with clubs in the regional leagues and with university teams, which lost their automatic spots. 

Hitachi won the championship.

Results

First round
Kofu Club 4–1 Nippon Steel Muroran
Chuo University 3–1 Nippon Steel Kamaishi
Osaka Sangyo University 1–3 Eidai Industries
Dainichi Cable Industries 3–2 Fukuoka University
NTT Kinki 1–3 Toyota Motors
Waseda University 2–3 Nippon Light Metal
Tanabe Pharmaceuticals 3–1 Teijin Matsuyama
Keio University 4–2 Toyama Club

Second round
Hitachi 2–0 Kofu Club
Towa Estate Development 2–0 Chuo University
Nippon Kokan 3–1 Eidai Industries
Mitsubishi Motors 9–0 Dainichi Cable Industries
Nippon Steel 4–0 Toyota Motors
Toyo Industries 2–0 Nippon Light Metal
Furukawa Electric 4–2 Tanabe Pharmaceuticals
Yanmar Diesel 4–0 Keio University

Quarter-finals
Hitachi 4–0 Towa Estate Development
Nippon Kokan 3–0 Mitsubishi Motors
Nippon Steel 2–2 (PK 4–5) Toyo Industries
Furukawa Electric 1–4 Yanmar Diesel

Semi-finals
Hitachi 2–0 Nippon Kokan
Toyo Industries 0–1 Yanmar Diesel

Final

Hitachi 2–1 Yanmar Diesel
Hitachi won the championship.

References
 NHK

Emperor's Cup
Emperor's Cup
1973 in Japanese football